In topology and related areas of mathematics, a metrizable space is a topological space that is homeomorphic to a metric space.

Properties

Metrizable spaces inherit all topological properties from metric spaces. For example, they are Hausdorff paracompact spaces (and hence normal and Tychonoff) and first-countable.  However, some properties of the metric, such as completeness, cannot be said to be inherited. This is also true of other structures linked to the metric. A metrizable uniform space, for example, may have a different set of contraction maps than a metric space to which it is homeomorphic.

Metrization theorems

This states that every Hausdorff second-countable regular space is metrizable. So, for example, every second-countable manifold is metrizable. (Historical note: The form of the theorem shown here was in fact proved by Tikhonov in 1926. What Urysohn had shown, in a paper published posthumously in 1925, was that every second-countable normal Hausdorff space is metrizable). The converse does not hold: there exist metric spaces that are not second countable, for example, an uncountable set endowed with the discrete metric. The Nagata–Smirnov metrization theorem, described below, provides a more specific theorem where the converse does hold.

Several other metrization theorems follow as simple corollaries to Urysohn's theorem. For example, a compact Hausdorff space is metrizable if and only if it is second-countable.

Urysohn's Theorem can be restated as: A topological space is separable and metrizable if and only if it is regular, Hausdorff and second-countable. The Nagata–Smirnov metrization theorem extends this to the non-separable case. It states that a topological space is metrizable if and only if it is regular, Hausdorff and has a σ-locally finite base. A σ-locally finite base is a base which is a union of countably many locally finite collections of open sets. For a closely related theorem see the Bing metrization theorem.

Separable metrizable spaces can also be characterized as those spaces which are homeomorphic to a subspace of the Hilbert cube  that is, the countably infinite product of the unit interval (with its natural subspace topology from the reals) with itself, endowed with the product topology.

A space is said to be locally metrizable if every point has a metrizable neighbourhood. Smirnov proved that a locally metrizable space is metrizable if and only if it is Hausdorff and paracompact. In particular, a manifold is metrizable if and only if it is paracompact.

Examples

The group of unitary operators  on a separable Hilbert space  endowed
with the strong operator topology is metrizable (see Proposition II.1 in ).

Examples of non-metrizable spaces

Non-normal spaces cannot be metrizable; important examples include
 the Zariski topology on an algebraic variety or on the spectrum of a ring, used in algebraic geometry,
 the topological vector space of all functions from the real line  to itself, with the topology of pointwise convergence.

The real line with the lower limit topology is not metrizable.  The usual distance function is not a metric on this space because the topology it determines is the usual topology, not the lower limit topology. This space is Hausdorff, paracompact and first countable.

Locally metrizable but not metrizable

Like all manifolds, it is locally homeomorphic to Euclidean space and thus locally metrizable (but not metrizable) and locally Hausdorff (but not Hausdorff). It is also a T1 locally regular space but not a semiregular space.

The long line is locally metrizable but not metrizable; in a sense it is "too long".

See also

 
 
 
 
 
 , the property of a topological space of being homeomorphic to a uniform space, or equivalently the topology being defined by a family of pseudometrics

References

General topology
Manifolds
Metric spaces
Properties of topological spaces
Theorems in topology
Topological spaces